STANAG 1236 Glide Slope Indicators for Helicopter Operations from NATO Ships is a NATO Standardization Agreement which establishes minimum standard requirements for the nomenclature; light characteristics; beam spread and elevation; intensity and intensity control; stabilisation; and installation of glideslope indicators used in helicopter operations between ships of NATO nations.

Sources
 NATO STANAG 1236 INT (Ed. 3, 2010) Glide Slope Indicators for Helicopter Operations from NATO Ships

1236